The 1991 Indian economic crisis was an economic crisis in India resulting from a balance of payments deficit due to excess reliance on imports and other external factors. India's economic problems started worsening in 1985 as imports swelled, leaving the country in a twin deficit: the Indian trade balance was in deficit at a time when the government was running on a huge fiscal deficit.  

The collapse of the Soviet Bloc, with which India had rupee exchange in trade, also caused problems. By the end of 1990, in the run-up to the Gulf War, the dire situation meant that the Indian foreign exchange reserves could have barely financed three weeks' worth of imports. Also the Iraq-Kuwait war made a drastic change in deficit as india was depending on them for crude oil. The crude oil prices rose rapidly due to the same leading to imbalance in indias BOP. The  Meanwhile, the government came close to defaulting on its own financial obligations. By July that year, the low reserves had led to a sharp depreciation/devaluation of the rupee, which in turn exacerbated the twin deficit problem. 

The Chandrasekhar government could not pass the budget in February 1991 after Moody downgraded India's bond ratings. The ratings further deteriorated due to the unsuccessful passage of the budget. The downgrade made it more difficult and more expensive for India to borrow money from international capital markets, and it added to the pressure on the country's economy. International Monetary Fund (IMF) suspended its loan program to India, and the World Bank also stopped its assistance. These actions left the government with few options to address the crisis, and it was forced to take drastic measures to avoid defaulting on its payments.

One of the measures taken by the government was to provide a large portion of the country's gold reserves to the Bank of England and the Union Bank of Switzerland as collateral. This action was intended to raise much-needed foreign exchange to help meet India's debt obligations and stabilize the country's economy. The decision to mortgage the country's gold was controversial and was seen by some as a sign of desperation. It was also viewed as a last resort, as the government had few other options available to address the crisis.

The crisis, in turn, paved the way for the liberalisation of the Indian economy, since one of the conditions stipulated in the World Bank and IMF loan (structural reform), required India to open itself up to participation from foreign entities in its industries, including its state-owned enterprises.

The program of economic policy reform which was put in place in 1990 has yielded good results, dramatically improving the quality of life in India. It also resulted in a large increase in inequality with the income share of the Top 10% of the population increasing from 35% in 1991 to 57.1% in 2014. Likewise, the income share of the Bottom 50% decreased from 20.1% in 1991 to 13.1% in 2014.

Causes and conscious 
The crisis was caused by currency overvaluation; the current account deficit, and investor confidence played significant role in the sharp exchange rate depreciation.

The economic crisis was primarily due to the large and growing fiscal imbalances over the 1980s. During the mid-eighties, India started having the balance of payments problems. Precipitated by the Gulf War, India’s oil import bill swelled, exports slumped, credit dried up, and investors took their money out. Large fiscal deficits, over time, had a spillover effect on the trade deficit culminating in an external payments crisis. By the end of the 1980s, India was in serious economic trouble.

One of the main causes of the crisis was the accumulation of foreign debt. In the 1980s, India had borrowed heavily from international lenders, in part to finance infrastructure projects and industrialization. However, by 1991, the country was facing a severe balance of payments crisis, as it was unable to service its debt and was running out of foreign exchange reserves.There were also structural problems in the Indian economy that contributed to the crisis, including a high fiscal deficit, low savings and investment rates, and inadequate export growth.

The gross fiscal deficit of the government (centre and states) rose from 9.0 percent of Gross Domestic Product (GDP) in 1980-81 to 10.4 percent in 1985-86 and to 12.7 percent in 1990-91. For the centre alone, the gross fiscal deficit rose from 6.1 percent of GDP in 1980-81 to 8.3 percent in 1985-86 and to 8.4 percent in 1990-91. Since these deficits had to be met by borrowings, the internal debt of the government accumulated rapidly, rising from 35 percent of GDP at the end of 1980-81 to 53 percent of GDP at the end of 1990-91. The foreign exchange reserves had dried up to the point that India could barely finance three weeks worth of imports.

In mid-1991, India's exchange rate was subjected to a severe adjustment. This event began with a slide in the value of the Indian rupee leading up to mid-1991. The authorities at the Reserve Bank of India took partial action, defending the currency by expanding international reserves and slowing the decline in value. However, in mid-1991, with foreign reserves nearly depleted, the Indian government permitted a sharp devaluation that took place in two steps within three days (1 July and 3 July 1991) against major currencies.

Recovery 

With India’s foreign exchange reserves at $1.2 billion in January 1991 and depleted by half by June, barely enough to last for roughly 3 weeks of essential imports, India was only weeks away from defaulting on its external balance of payment obligations.

Government of India's immediate response was to secure an emergency loan of $2.2 billion from the International Monetary Fund by pledging 67 tons of India's gold reserves as collateral security. The Reserve Bank of India had to airlift 47 tons of gold to the Bank of England and 20 tons of gold to the Union Bank of Switzerland to raise $600 million.  The van transporting the gold to the airport broke down en route due to tyre burst and panic followed . The airlift was done with secrecy as it was done in the midst of the 1991 Indian General elections. National sentiments were outraged and there was public outcry when it was learned that the government had pledged the country's entire gold reserves against the loan. A chartered plane ferried the precious cargo to London between 21 May and 31 May 1991. The Chandra Shekhar government had collapsed a few months after having authorised the airlift. The move helped tide over the balance of payment crisis and kick-started P. V. Narasimha Rao's economic reform process.

Under Narsimha Rao Government
P. V. Narasimha Rao took over as Prime Minister in June, and appointed Manmohan Singh as Finance Minister. The Narasimha Rao government ushered in several reforms that are collectively termed as liberalisation in the Indian media.

The reforms formally began on 1 July 1991 when RBI devalued Indian Rupee by 9% and by a further 11% on 3 July. It was done in two doses to test the reaction of the market first by making a smaller depreciation of 9%. There was significant opposition to such reforms, suggesting they were an "interference with India's autonomy". Then Prime Minister Rao's speech a week after he took office highlighted the necessity for reforms, as New York Times reported, "Mr. Rao, who was sworn in as Prime Minister last week, has already sent a signal to the nation—as well as the I.M.F.—that India faced no "soft options" and must open the door to foreign investment, reduce red tape that often cripples initiative, and streamline industrial policy. Mr. Rao made his comments in a speech to the nation Saturday night." The foreign reserves started picking up with the onset of the liberalisation policies and reached an all-time high US $530.268 billion as on 13 November 2020

Aftermath 
Since 1991, India's economy has grown significantly, and the country has become a major player in the global economy. Liberalisation has played a role in this growth by allowing for increased foreign investment and trade, as well as by promoting domestic economic reform and growth. 

The Indian GDP rose from $266 billion in 1991 (inflation adjusted) to $3 trillion in 2019 while its purchasing power parity rose from $1 trillion in 1991 to $12 trillion in 2019. India continues to face significant challenges, including poverty, malnutrition and unemployment. Poverty is a persistent problem in India, with a significant portion of the population living below the poverty line. Despite economic growth and development, many people in India still lack access to basic necessities such as food, shelter, and healthcare.Low life expectancy is also a persistent challenge in India, with the average life expectancy being lower than the global average.

Trade liberalisation in India has also corresponded with a dramatic rise in inequality and associated social issues.

See also 
Economic liberalisation in India
Corruption in India
Economic history of India
Economy of India
Licence Raj
The 1991 Project

References 

Economic history of India (1947–present)
History of the Republic of India
India Economic Crisis, 1991
Rao administration
Chandra Shekhar administration
Economic crises
Samajwadi Janata Party (Rashtriya)
1991 in Indian economy